Ruth Clifford (February 17, 1900 – November 30, 1998) was an American actress of leading roles in silent films, whose career lasted from that era into the television era.

Early years
Clifford was born in Pawtucket, Rhode Island, the daughter of parents who were both born in England. Following her mother's death when Ruth was 11, she and her sister were placed in St. Mary's Seminary in Narragansett, Rhode Island. Four years later, they went to Los Angeles to live with their actress aunt.

Film 
Clifford got work as an extra and began her career at 15 at Universal, in fairly substantial roles. She received her first film credit for her work in Behind the Lines (1916).

By her mid-twenties, she was playing leads and second leads, including the role of Abraham Lincoln's lost love, Ann Rutledge, in The Dramatic Life of Abraham Lincoln (1924). But sound pictures found her roles diminishing, and throughout the next three decades she played smaller and smaller parts.

She was a favorite of director John Ford (they played bridge together), who used her in eight films, but rarely in substantial roles. She was also, for a time, the voice of Walt Disney's Minnie Mouse and Daisy Duck.

Clifford's obituary in the Los Angeles Times noted that she "became a prime source for historians of the silent screen era".

Stage
In the 1940s, Clifford toured the United States as a member of the Abbey Theatre Company and had lead roles in "classic Irish plays".

Television 
In the 1950s, Clifford appeared in episodes of Highway Patrol and in commercials.

Personal life 
Clifford married Beverly Hills, California real-estate developer James Cornelius on December 5, 1924. They had one child and divorced in 1938.

Death
Clifford died in Woodland Hills, California, on November 30, 1998, at the age of 98. Her interment was in Culver City's Holy Cross Cemetery. She was survived by two first cousins.

Selected filmography

 Behind the Lines (1916) - Camilla
 Polly Put the Kettle On (1917) - Polly Vance
 Eternal Love (1917) - Mignon
 A Kentucky Cinderella (1917) - Nannie
 Mother O' Mine (1917) - Catherine Thurston
 The Mysterious Mr. Tiller (1917) - Clara Hawthorne
 The Desire of the Moth (1917) - Stella Vorhis
The Door Between (1917)- Heloise Crocker
 The Savage (1917) - Marie Louise
 Hands Down (1918) - Hilda Stuyvesant
 The Kaiser, the Beast of Berlin (1918) - Gabrielle
 Hungry Eyes (1918) - Mary Jane Appleton
 The Red, Red Heart (1918) - Rhoda Tuttle
 The Guilt of Silence (1918) - Mary
 Midnight Madness (1918) - Gertrude Temple
 Fires of Youth (1918) - Lucille Linforth
 The Lure of Luxury (1918) - Dalle Aldis
 The Cabaret Girl (1918) - Ann Reid
 The Game's Up (1919) - Ruth Elliott
 The Millionaire Pirate (1919) - The Girl
 The Black Gate (1919) - Vera Hampton
 The Amazing Woman (1920) - Anitra Frane
 The Invisible Ray (1920, Serial) - Mystery
 Tropical Love (1921) - Rosario
 My Dad (1922) - Dawn
 The Face on the Bar-Room Floor (1923) - Marion Trevor
 The Dangerous Age (1923) - Gloria Sanderson
 Truxton King (1923) - Lorraine
 Daughters of the Rich (1923) - Sally Malakoff
 Mothers-in-Law (1923) - Vianna Courtleigh
 Hell's Hole (1923) - Dorothy Owen
 April Showers (1923) - Miriam Welton
 Ponjola (1923) - Gay Lypiatt
 The Whispered Name (1924) - Anne Gray
 The Dramatic Life of Abraham Lincoln (1924) - Ann Rutledge
 Butterfly (1924) - Hilary Collier
 The Tornado (1924) - Ruth Travers
 As Man Desires (1925) - Gloria Gordon
 Her Husband's Secret (1925) - Mrs. Pearce
 The Phantom of the Opera (1925) - Ballerina (uncredited)
 The Love Hour (1925) - Betty Brown
 The Storm Breaker (1925) - Lysette DeJon
 Brooding Eyes (1926) - Joan Ayre
 Typhoon Love (1926)
 Lew Tyler's Wives (1926) - Jessie Winkler
Don Mike (1927) - Mary Kelsey
The Thrill Seekers (1927) - Adrean Wainwright
 The Devil's Apple Tree (1929) - Jane Norris
 The Eternal Woman (1929) - Doris Forbes
 The Show of Shows (1929) - Performer in 'Ladies of the Ensemble' Number
 The Sign of the Cross (1932) - Christian Mother at Meeting (uncredited)
 Face in the Sky (1933) - Hotel Guest with Dog (uncredited)
 The Constant Woman (1933) - Speakeasy Floozie
 Pilgrimage (1933) - Schoolteacher (uncredited)
 Only Yesterday (1933) - Eleanor (uncredited)
 Miss Fane's Baby Is Stolen (1934) - Friend of Miss Fane (uncredited)
 Woman Unafraid (1934) - Kate
 Stand Up and Cheer! (1934) - Secretary (uncredited)
 Whom the Gods Destroy (1934) - Frightened Balkan Passenger (uncredited)
 Elmer and Elsie (1934) - Mamie
 Lady by Choice (1934) - Minor Role (uncredited)
 Let's Live Tonight (1935) - American (uncredited)
 Stolen Harmony (1935) - Nurse (uncredited)
 Hold 'Em Yale (1935) - (uncredited)
 Ginger (1935) - Society Woman (uncredited)
 Dante's Inferno (1935) - Mrs. Gray (uncredited)
 The Farmer Takes a Wife (1935) - Yorkshire Pioneer's Wife (uncredited)
 She Married Her Boss (1935) - Shopper (uncredited)
 Paddy O'Day (1936) - Mrs. Right - First Class Passenger (uncredited)
 The Return of Jimmy Valentine (1936) - Radio Actress (uncredited)
 The Crime of Dr. Forbes (1936) - Reporter (uncredited)
 To Mary - with Love (1936) - Nurse
 Hollywood Boulevard (1936) - Nurse (uncredited)
 Four Men and a Prayer (1938) - Telephone Operator (uncredited)
 Safety in Numbers (1938) - Mrs. Hensley
 Keep Smiling (1938) - Schoolteacher (uncredited)
 Charlie Chan in Honolulu (1938) - Nurse (uncredited)
 Wife, Husband and Friend (1939) - Seamstress (uncredited)
 Drums Along the Mohawk (1939) - Pioneer Woman (uncredited)
 The Honeymoon's Over (1939) - Receptionist (uncredited)
 Swanee River (1939) - Bit Role (uncredited)
 The Man Who Wouldn't Talk (1940) - Mrs. Finney (uncredited)
 Free, Blonde and 21 (1940) - Nurse (uncredited)
 Lillian Russell (1940) - Extra (uncredited)
 Sailor's Lady (1940) - Maid (uncredited)
 Along the Rio Grande (1941) - Paula
 We Go Fast (1941) - Miss Kertz - Hempstead's Secretary (uncredited)
 Mr. Celebrity (1941) - Woman In Convertible
 How Green Was My Valley (1941) - Village Woman (uncredited)
 Cadet Girl (1941) - Minor Role (uncredited)
 Road to Happiness (1941) - Ship Passenger (uncredited)
 Blue, White and Perfect (1942) - Ship's Passenger (uncredited)
 Land of the Open Range (1942) - Mrs. Palmer (uncredited)
 It Happened in Flatbush (1942) - Ruth - Mrs. McAvoy's Secretary (uncredited)
 Ten Gentlemen from West Point (1942) - Graduation Spectator (uncredited)
 The Postman Didn't Ring (1942) - Secretary (uncredited)
 Holiday Inn (1942) - Guest at Inn (uncredited)
 Coney Island (1943) - Saloon Patron (uncredited)
 The Lodger(1944) - Hairdresser (uncredited)
 In the Meantime, Darling (1944) - Mrs. Phillips (uncredited)
 The Keys of the Kingdom (1944) - Sister Mercy Mary (uncredited)
 Leave Her to Heaven (1945) - Telephone Operator (uncredited)
 The Spider (1945) - Mrs. Gillespie, Tenant
 Shock (1946) - Mrs. Margaret Cross (uncredited)
 My Darling Clementine (1946) - Opera House Patron (uncredited)
 Mother Wore Tights (1947) - Resort Guest (uncredited)
 Fun and Fancy Free (1947) - Minnie Mouse (uncredited)
 Hazard (1948) - Waitress (uncredited)
 The Walls of Jericho (1948) - (uncredited)
 The Luck of the Irish (1948) - Secretary (uncredited)
 Cry of the City (1948) - Nurse (uncredited)
 The Snake Pit (1948) - Nurse (uncredited)
 Unfaithfully Yours (1948) - Saleslady (uncredited)
 3 Godfathers (1948) - Woman in Bar (uncredited)
 Not Wanted (1949) - Mrs. Elizabeth Stone
 You're My Everything (1949) - Nurse (uncredited)
 Father Was a Fullback (1949) - Neighbor
 Prejudice (1949) - Ma Hanson's Friend (uncredited)
 Everybody Does It (1949) - Nurse (uncredited)
 Free for All (1949) - Miss Berry (uncredited)
 Whirlpool (1949) - Nurse Eliott (uncredited)
 Key to the City (1950) - Mrs. Anderson (uncredited)
 Wagon Master (1950) - Fleuretty Phyffe
 Sunset Boulevard (1950) - Sheldrake's Secretary (uncredited)
 The Quiet Man (1952) - Mother (uncredited)
 Stars and Stripes Forever (1952) - Brooklyn Navy Yard Nurse (uncredited)
 Flight Nurse (1953) - Mother (uncredited)
 Give a Girl a Break (1953) - Madelyn's Mother (uncredited)
 Prince of Players (1955) - English Nurse (uncredited), Mrs. Jenkins
 A Man Called Peter (1955) - Nurse (uncredited)
 The Man in the Gray Flannel Suit (1956) - Florence (uncredited)
 The Searchers (1956) - Deranged Woman at Fort (uncredited)
 Bigger Than Life (1956) - Churchgoer (uncredited)
 Designing Woman (1957) - Vanessa Cole (uncredited)
 The Last Hurrah (1958) - Nurse (uncredited)
 Sergeant Rutledge (1960) - Officer's Wife (uncredited)
 Two Rode Together (1961) - Woman (uncredited)
 I'd Rather Be Rich (1964) - Director's Wife (uncredited)
 Funny Girl (1968) - Maid (uncredited)

References

External links

1900 births
1998 deaths
American film actresses
American silent film actresses
Burials at Holy Cross Cemetery, Culver City
People from Pawtucket, Rhode Island
People from Greater Los Angeles
Actresses from Rhode Island
20th-century American actresses
Disney people